{{DISPLAYTITLE:C14H18N4O3}}
The molecular formula C14H18N4O3 (molar mass: 290.318 g/mol, exact mass: 290.1379 u) may refer to:

 Benomyl
 Trimethoprim (TMP)

Molecular formulas